The pancreatic branches or pancreatic arteries are numerous small vessels derived from the splenic artery as it runs behind the upper border of the pancreas, supplying its body and tail.

One of these, larger than the rest, is sometimes given off near the tail of the pancreas; it runs from left to right near the posterior surface of the gland, following the course of the pancreatic duct, and is called the greater pancreatic artery.

These vessels anastomose with the pancreatic branches of the superior and inferior pancreaticoduodenal artery that are given off by the gastroduodenal artery and superior mesenteric artery respectively.

Branches
There are four main pancreatic branches of the splenic artery:
Greater pancreatic artery
Dorsal pancreatic artery
Inferior pancreatic artery (aka transverse pancreatic artery)
Caudal pancreatic artery

References

External links
 
 

Arteries of the abdomen